San Pedro Carchá, usually referred to as Carchá, is a town, with a population of 16,353 (2018 census), and a municipality in the Guatemalan department of Alta Verapaz. It is situated at 1282 m above sea level. The municipality has a population of 235,275 (2018 census) and covers an area of 1310 km².

Sports
Deportivo Carchá football club play their home games in the Estadio Juan Ramon Ponce Guay. They have played in Guatemala's top division from 1998-2001.

Franja Transversal del Norte 

The Northern Transversal Strip was officially created during the government of General Carlos Arana Osorio in 1970, by Legislative Decree 60-70, for agricultural development. The decree literally said: "It is of public interest and national emergency, the establishment of Agrarian Development Zones in the area included within the municipalities: San Ana Huista, San Antonio Huista, Nentón, Jacaltenango, San Mateo Ixtatán, and Santa Cruz Barillas in Huehuetenango; Chajul and San Miguel Uspantán in Quiché; Cobán, Chisec, San Pedro Carchá, Lanquín, Senahú, Cahabón and Chahal, in Alta Verapaz and the entire department of Izabal."

Climate

San Pedro Carchá has a warm and temperate climate (Köppen: Cfb).

Geographic location

San Pedro Carchá is completely surrounded by Alta Verapaz department municipalities:

Gallery

Notes and references

References

Bibliography

External links
 
Muni in Spanish

Municipalities of the Alta Verapaz Department